Ignacio Ordóñez (22 February 1966 – 7 October 2020) was a Spanish wrestler. He competed in the men's freestyle 74 kg at the 1984 Summer Olympics.

References

1966 births
2020 deaths
Spanish male sport wrestlers
Olympic wrestlers of Spain
Wrestlers at the 1984 Summer Olympics
Place of birth missing
20th-century Spanish people